Paasaal, or Pasaale Sisaala (Southern Sisaala) is a Gur language of Ghana, with a thousand speakers in Ivory Coast. The two dialects, Gilbagala and Pasaali, are part of a dialect continuum that continues on into Sisaala.

References

Languages of Ghana
Gurunsi languages